Hotel Touraine (1897-1966) in Boston, Massachusetts, was a residential hotel on the corner of Tremont Street and Boylston Street, near the Boston Common. The architecture firm of Winslow and Wetherell designed the 11-story building in the Jacobethan style, constructed of "brick and limestone;" its "baronial" appearance was "patterned inside and out after a 16th-century chateau of the dukes of Touraine." It had dining rooms and a circulating library. Owners included Joseph Reed Whipple and George A. Turain.

Directly across the street were the clandestine  district headquarters of the Boston Communist Party mentioned in Herbert Philbrick's 1952 book "I Led 3 Lives".

Among the guests: boxer Max Baer, actor Stanley Bell, Diamond Jim Brady, George Gershwin, Ernest Wadsworth Longfellow, Pietro Mascagni, Mitch Miller, Justice Oliver Wendell Holmes Jr., and Henry Bradford Endicott.  Events included an exhibition in the 1960s of the Boston Negro Artists Association, and performances by the "Theater Company of Boston." The hotel closed in 1966 and became an apartment building.

Images

References

External links

 Bostonian Society: 
 Photo of construction projects at the corner of Boylston and Tremont Streets, 1896
 Photo of construction of Hotel Touraine, Tremont and Boylston Streets, 1897
 Boston Public Library. Max Baer looks thoughtful in his room at the Hotel Touraine, photo, 1935

Boston Theater District
Hotel buildings completed in 1897
Apartment buildings in Boston
Hotels in Boston